Martin Ndtongou Mpile (born in 1958 in Cameroon) is a Cameroonian football coach, He was the coach of the Cameroonian Olympic team in the 2008 Summer Olympics.

References

Living people
1958 births
Date of birth missing (living people)
Place of birth missing (living people)
Cameroonian football managers
21st-century Cameroonian people